These species belong to Cedusa, a genus of derbid planthoppers in the family Derbidae.

Cedusa species

 Cedusa albolineata Fennah, 1952
 Cedusa alexanderi Flynn & Kramer, 1983
 Cedusa andara Kramer, 1986
 Cedusa angolensis (Van Stalle, 1984)
 Cedusa apicata Caldwell, 1944
 Cedusa arizonensis Flynn & Kramer, 1983
 Cedusa australis (Metcalf, 1923)
 Cedusa aziza Kramer, 1986
 Cedusa balli Flynn & Kramer, 1983
 Cedusa balloui Flynn & Kramer, 1983
 Cedusa beameri Flynn & Kramer, 1983
 Cedusa bedusa Mc Atee, 1924
 Cedusa belma Kramer, 1986
 Cedusa bicolor (Van Stalle, 1984)
 Cedusa blantoni Flynn & Kramer, 1983
 Cedusa bolopa Kramer, 1986
 Cedusa borneensis Muir, 1913
 Cedusa brachycara (Van Stalle, 1986)
 Cedusa brazilensis Flynn & Kramer, 1983
 Cedusa bruneri Flynn & Kramer, 1983
 Cedusa caldwelli Flynn & Kramer, 1983
 Cedusa californica (Van Duzee, 1891)
 Cedusa caribbensis Caldwell, 1950
 Cedusa carolinensis Flynn & Kramer, 1983
 Cedusa carranzensis Caldwell, 1944
 Cedusa carropia Kramer, 1986
 Cedusa catasia Kramer, 1986
 Cedusa cedusa Mc Atee, 1924
 Cedusa chuluota Ball, 1928
 Cedusa cocos (Van Stalle, 1984)
 Cedusa coerulea (Van Stalle, 1984)
 Cedusa colona Caldwell, 1950
 Cedusa complicata (Van Stalle, 1982)
 Cedusa consimilis (Van Stalle, 1984)
 Cedusa costaricensis Flynn & Kramer, 1983
 Cedusa cubensis Flynn & Kramer, 1983
 Cedusa cyanea Fennah, 1945
 Cedusa cydippe (Linnavuori, 1973)
 Cedusa dampfi Caldwell, 1944
 Cedusa delongi Caldwell, 1944
 Cedusa dietzi Flynn & Kramer, 1983
 Cedusa digitata Caldwell, 1944
 Cedusa dilbata Kramer, 1986
 Cedusa drilda Kramer, 1986
 Cedusa dubiata Caldwell, 1944
 Cedusa ecuadorensis Flynn & Kramer, 1983
 Cedusa edentula (Van Duzee, 1912)
 Cedusa edox Kramer, 1986
 Cedusa elongata Caldwell, 1944
 Cedusa enosala Kramer, 1986
 Cedusa exiqua (Van Stalle, 1984)
 Cedusa febora Kramer, 1986
 Cedusa fennahi Flynn & Kramer, 1983
 Cedusa fitchiella Flynn & Kramer, 1983
 Cedusa flava (Van Stalle, 1984)
 Cedusa flavescens (Van Stalle, 1984)
 Cedusa flavicephala (Van Stalle, 1984)
 Cedusa flavida (Van Duzee, 1907)
 Cedusa flynni Kramer, 1986
 Cedusa fowleri Flynn & Kramer, 1986
 Cedusa funesta Fowler, 1904
 Cedusa furcata Caldwell, 1944
 Cedusa furcifera (Van Stalle, 1984)
 Cedusa fuscata Caldwell, 1944
 Cedusa gedusa Mc Atee, 1924
 Cedusa gonuga Kramer, 1986
 Cedusa grancara Kramer, 1986
 Cedusa hampora Kramer, 1986
 Cedusa hedusa Mc Atee, 1924
 Cedusa hyola Kramer, 1986
 Cedusa impada Kramer, 1986
 Cedusa incisa (Metcalf, 1923)
 Cedusa inflata (Ball, 1902)
 Cedusa insularis Flynn & Kramer, 1983
 Cedusa irengana Fennah, 1944
 Cedusa isinara Kramer, 1986
 Cedusa isinica (Dlabola, 1986)
 Cedusa isthmusensis Flynn & Kramer, 1983
 Cedusa jacobii Jacobi, 1928
 Cedusa janola Kramer, 1986
 Cedusa jarata Kramer, 1986
 Cedusa jinwista Kramer, 1986
 Cedusa kalala Kramer, 1986
 Cedusa kedusa Mc Atee, 1924
 Cedusa kilisica (Dlabola, 1986)
 Cedusa kinoxa Kramer, 1986
 Cedusa kivuensis (Van Stalle, 1984)
 Cedusa kulashi Flynn & Kramer, 1983
 Cedusa kulia (Kirkaldy, 1906)
 Cedusa ledusa (Mc Atee, 1924)
 Cedusa licea (Dlabola, 1979)
 Cedusa lineata Caldwell, 1944
 Cedusa lugubrina (Stål, 1862)
 Cedusa lumeda Kramer, 1986
 Cedusa macateei Flynn & Kramer, 1983
 Cedusa maculata (Van Duzee, 1912)
 Cedusa maculosa (Van Duzee, 1912)
 Cedusa mallochi Mc Atee, 1924
 Cedusa marlota Kramer, 1986
 Cedusa martini Flynn & Kramer, 1983
 Cedusa masirica (Dlabola, 1986)
 Cedusa medusa Mc Atee, 1924
 Cedusa mesasiatica (Dubovskiy, 1965)
 Cedusa metcalfi Flynn & Kramer, 1983
 Cedusa mexicana Caldwell, 1944
 Cedusa minuenda Ball, 1928
 Cedusa minuta (Van Stalle, 1984)
 Cedusa montana (Van Stalle, 1984)
 Cedusa monticola (Van Stalle, 1984)
 Cedusa morrisoni Flynn & Kramer, 1983
 Cedusa muiri Flynn & Kramer, 1983
 Cedusa mutilata Caldwell, 1944
 Cedusa nedusa Caldwell, 1944
 Cedusa neodigitata Caldwell, 1944
 Cedusa neomaculata Caldwell, 1944
 Cedusa nortoma Kramer, 1986
 Cedusa noxora Kramer, 1986
 Cedusa obscura (Ball, 1902)
 Cedusa olasca Kramer, 1986
 Cedusa olseni Flynn & Kramer, 1983
 Cedusa ozda Kramer, 1986
 Cedusa pacuta Kramer, 1986
 Cedusa panamensis Flynn & Kramer, 1983
 Cedusa pedusa Mc Atee, 1924
 Cedusa peruensis Flynn & Kramer, 1983
 Cedusa pipsewa Kramer, 1986
 Cedusa plaumanni Flynn & Kramer, 1983
 Cedusa plummeri Caldwell, 1944
 Cedusa poochia Kramer, 1986
 Cedusa praecox (Van Duzee, 1912)
 Cedusa pseudomaculata Caldwell, 1944
 Cedusa pseudonigripes (Van Stalle, 1984)
 Cedusa quimata Kramer, 1986
 Cedusa quinteca Kramer, 1986
 Cedusa redusa Mc Atee, 1924
 Cedusa remettei Flynn & Kramer, 1983
 Cedusa reota Kramer, 1986
 Cedusa roseifrons (Kramer, 1986)
 Cedusa sanctaecatharinae Flynn & Kramer, 1983
 Cedusa senbara Kramer, 1986
 Cedusa serrata Caldwell, 1944
 Cedusa shawi Flynn & Kramer, 1983
 Cedusa similis Caldwell, 1944
 Cedusa simplex Flynn & Kramer, 1983
 Cedusa siopa Kramer, 1986
 Cedusa spinosa (Metcalf, 1945)
 Cedusa stali Flynn & Kramer, 1983
 Cedusa striata (Van Stalle, 1984)
 Cedusa tincta Caldwell, 1944
 Cedusa turkestanica (Dubovskiy, 1965)
 Cedusa tuvaga Kramer, 1986
 Cedusa ulora Kramer, 1986
 Cedusa unsera Kramer, 1986
 Cedusa ussurica (Anufriev, 1968)
 Cedusa uzama Kramer, 1986
 Cedusa vanduzeei Flynn & Kramer, 1983
 Cedusa varopa Kramer, 1986
 Cedusa vedusa Mc Atee, 1924
 Cedusa venosa Fowler, 1904
 Cedusa vidola Kramer, 1986
 Cedusa vulgaris (Fitch, 1851)
 Cedusa whitei Flynn & Kramer, 1983
 Cedusa widisca Kramer, 1986
 Cedusa wolcotti Muir, 1924
 Cedusa wontula Kramer, 1986
 Cedusa woodsholensis Flynn & Kramer, 1983
 Cedusa woodyga Kramer, 1986
 Cedusa xenga Kramer, 1986
 Cedusa xipola Kramer, 1986
 Cedusa xumara Kramer, 1986
 Cedusa yarosa Kramer, 1986
 Cedusa yipara Kramer, 1986
 Cedusa yowza Kramer, 1986
 Cedusa zantata Kramer, 1986
 Cedusa zaxoza Kramer, 1986
 Cedusa zedusa Caldwell, 1944
 Cedusa zeteki Flynn & Kramer, 1983
 † Cedusa baylissae Szwedo & Ross, 2003
 † Cedusa credula Emeljanov & Shcherbakov, 2000

References

Cedusa